The Family of Mann (subtitled The Music of Herbie Mann) is an album by American jazz flautist Herbie Mann recorded in 1961 for the Atlantic label.

Reception

Allmusic awarded the album 3 stars stating "Herbie Mann's second in a long string of albums for Atlantic resulted in some slightly commercial but mostly enjoyable music".

Track listing
All compositions by Herbie Mann except as indicated
 "Why Don't You Do Right?" (Joe McCoy) - 2:29 	
 "Guinean" - 4:55 	
 "The Puppet" - 4:30 	
 "Shein vi di Levone" (Joseph Rumshinsky) - 7:01 	
 "Moanin'" (Bobby Timmons) - 6:46 	
 "This Little Girl of Mine" (Ray Charles) - 2:27 	
 "The Song of Delilah" (Victor Young, Jay Livingston, Ray Evans) - 6:10 	
 "Au Privave" (Charlie Parker) - 6:33

Personnel 
Herbie Mann - flute, arranger
Knobby Totah - bass
Rudy Collins - drums
Ray Mantilla, Ray Barretto - percussion 
Dave Pike - vibraphone (tracks 2-5, 7 & 8) 
Leo Ball, Johnny Bello, Jerome Kail, Ziggy Schatz - trumpet (tracks 3 & 5)
Jose Andreu, Daniel Gonzales, Joe Silva - violin (tracks 1 & 6)
Charlie Palmieri - piano (tracks 1 & 6)
Juan Garcia - bass (tracks 1 & 6) 
Willie Rodriguez - percussion (tracks 1 & 6)

References 

1961 albums
Herbie Mann albums
Albums produced by Nesuhi Ertegun
Atlantic Records albums